Mamtaz Sanghamita is a physician and an Indian politician. She was a member of parliament to the 16th Lok Sabha from Bardhaman-Durgapur (Lok Sabha constituency), West Bengal. She won the 2014 Indian general election being an All India Trinamool Congress candidate.
 
Mamtaz Sanghamita is daughter of the late Syed Abdul Mansur Habibullah, a former Speaker of the West Bengal assembly and a former Law Minister, and Maqsooda Khatoon, an educationist.

A gynaecologist by profession, she was head of the department of gynaecology at Calcutta Medical College and Hospital.

Early life
She attended the Municipal Girls School in Bardhaman and the Brahmo Balika Shikshalaya in Kolkata from where she passed out in first division securing letter in four subjects. She completed Pre-Medical from Bethune College. She passed MBBS from Calcutta Medical College in 1968. This was followed by DGO in 1970 from the University of Calcutta and MD (OTG) from Delhi University. She went to UK for higher studies.

Family
In 1975 she married Nurey Alam Chowdhury, a barrister and later a Cabinet Minister in the State Government. Their only daughter Dr. Shabana Roze is a MBBS from National Medical College and is pursuing higher medical research.

References

India MPs 2014–2019
Living people
Lok Sabha members from West Bengal
1946 births
Bethune College alumni
University of Calcutta alumni
Academic staff of the University of Calcutta
People from Purba Bardhaman district
Women in West Bengal politics
Trinamool Congress politicians from West Bengal
21st-century Indian women politicians
21st-century Indian politicians
Indian gynaecologists
20th-century Indian medical doctors
Indian women medical doctors
Women scientists from West Bengal
Medical doctors from Kolkata
20th-century Indian women scientists
20th-century women physicians